East Campus may refer to:

 East Campus Neighborhood, in Columbia, Missouri
 East Campus (Duke University)
 East Campus (Columbia University)
 East Campus (Massachusetts Institute of Technology)
 East Campus (Western Michigan University)
 East Campus station, a light rail station under construction in College Park, Maryland